Cheongpyeong Station is a railway station on the Gyeongchun Line.

External links
 Station information from Korail

Railway stations in Gyeonggi Province
Seoul Metropolitan Subway stations
Metro stations in Gapyeong County
Railway stations opened in 1939